Veronica Cummings (born 29 March 1973) is a freestyle swimmer who represented Guam. She competed in two events at the 1988 Summer Olympics. She was the first woman to represent Guam at the Olympics.

References

External links
 

1973 births
Living people
Guamanian female freestyle swimmers
Olympic swimmers of Guam
Swimmers at the 1988 Summer Olympics
Place of birth missing (living people)
21st-century American women